GISMA Business School is a privately owned business school in Germany with its main site in Hannover and a branch in Berlin. It was launched in September 1999 as a joint initiative by the German state of Lower Saxony and several large private-sector companies that were based there. In financial difficulty after its partnership with Krannert School of Management ended, GISMA was rescued from bankruptcy when it was bought by the for-profit education company  Global University Systems in September 2013.

As of 2018 it offers a variety of undergraduate and postgraduate degrees, including MBAs, all of which are delivered and awarded by external institutions, as well as short courses in executive education.

History

Foundation and early years
GISMA was established by the state of Lower Saxony as a private non-profit foundation in 1998 and opened in Hannover in September 1999. Among those behind the initiative were former Federal Chancellor Gerhard Schröder and several large German companies, including Continental AG, Volkswagen AG, and the steel industry conglomerate  Georgsmarienhütte Holding GmbH, all of which are based in Lower Saxony. The companies supported the school by making annual donations and sending their employees to its MBA programmes. From the outset GISMA formed a partnership agreement whereby it would pay Krannert School of Management in the United States to deliver and award the MBAs. Krannert's students also had the option of studying for their MBAs at the GISMA site in Hannover. The first class of 21 MBA students graduated in July 2000.

Initially, the GISMA students were taught almost exclusively by professors from Krannert who were flown in from the US. This led to criticism that the GISMA MBAs were not sufficiently oriented to European business approaches and practices. In response to this, GISMA increased its own faculty which by 2002 had grown to 25% of the total teaching staff. In addition to the 11-month full-time MBA and the two-year part-time Executive MBA programmes provided by Krannert, GISMA also started a home-grown Executive MBA in Health Management in cooperation with Hannover Medical School. It was jointly taught by faculty from GISMA and the Hannover School of Health Management. GISMA formed an additional partnership with Leibniz Universität Hannover in 2008 which allowed German graduates enrolled in GISMA to simultaneously receive MBAs from Krannert and from Leibniz Universität. In turn, Leibniz Universität and the GISMA Foundation became joint shareholders in GISMA GmbH.

Financial difficulties 2010–2013
Financial difficulties which arose in 2010 led to GISMA becoming an Associated Institute of the Leibniz Universität in 2011. It was hoped that the new arrangement would secure the business school's future. A new management board was appointed  for the GISMA Foundation consisting of the Economics Minister of Lower Saxony, Jörg Bode; the President of the Leibniz Universität, Erich Barke; and the Chief Executive of the Lower Saxony Associations of Employers, Volker Müller. Later that year GISMA moved its site from Heideviertel in the outskirts of Hannover to Goethestraße in the city center close to the Leibniz Universität campus. However, by 2012 GISMA was facing an increasing problem with student recruitment and its financial difficulties resurfaced. That year it had only been able to recruit 24 students to its full-time MBA programme which at that time had a capacity of 60 students.

By 2013 the school's deficit had grown to 1.2 million euros, the Lower Saxony Ministry of Economic Affairs had frozen its annual grant, and Volkswagen had canceled its sponsorship. When Krannert requested information about GISMA's potential bankruptcy in early May 2013 and did not receive a response from the school, it ceased its partnership. In June 2013 GISMA began bankruptcy proceedings. GISMA's former CEO Sonning Bredemeier told the Financial Times that there were a number of factors contributing to the school's insolvency, including the downturn in student numbers in 2012. Chris Earley, the Dean of Krannert School of Management at the time, said in an official statement that in addition to GISMA's difficulties in attracting students, "its internal struggles with turnover in its own organization ha[d] made a problematic fiscal situation even more difficult."

Acquisition by Global University Systems
GISMA was saved from bankruptcy in September 2013 when it was bought by the for-profit education company Global University Systems (GUS). The partnership with Leibniz Universität Hannover ended, apart from a weekend MBA programme which had enrolled students prior to the GUS takeover and ran until they completed their degrees in 2015. Following the takeover, GISMA formed new partnerships  with several other European institutions (including two owned by GUS) to deliver and award its degrees. Maurits van Rooijen, chief academic officer of GUS, was appointed its acting rector. A second site was opened in Berlin in 2017. As of 2019, it is located on the campus of University of Applied Sciences Europe. In early 2019 GISMA opened a UK centre at the University of Law's Bloomsbury campus where it delivers executive education and business short courses.

In 2021, GISMA Business School received official ‘University of Applied Sciences’ status which allows the school to offer bachelor's and master's degrees at its locations in Potsdam and Berlin, as well as a range of Hochschule programmes which focus on digital transformation, business, technology and agribusiness.’

Programmes 
In addition to business short courses, GISMA offers a variety of undergraduate and master's degree programmes in management and business studies, including MBAs. All degree programmes are taught in English and delivered and awarded by external institutions which include Grenoble Ecole de Management, Kingston University, University of Law, and Arden University. Like GISMA, University of Law and Arden University are owned by Global University Systems. GISMA is accredited by the AMBA. Its Executive MBA programme and the MSc programmes in Leadership for Digital Transformation and in Agribusiness are also accredited by the FIBAA.

Notable faculty and alumni
Utz Claassen, German manager and management consultant (former professor of innovative corporate management, risk management and knowledge management, Krannert School of Management at GISMA)
Gerald J. Lynch, American economist and academic administrator (former professor of economics and dean of Krannert School of Management at GISMA)
Abigail Spanberger, elected to the US House of Representatives in Virginia's 7th congressional district in 2018 (MBA graduate of the Krannert School of Management at GISMA)

References

External links
 

Business schools in Germany
Private universities and colleges in Germany
Universities and colleges in Lower Saxony
1999 establishments in Germany
For-profit universities and colleges in Europe